Environmental Values started as a quarterly peer-reviewed academic journal closely associated with the ecological economics movement, but also firmly based in applied ethics. Subjects covered are philosophy, economics, politics, sociology, geography, anthropology, ecology, and other disciplines, which relate to the present and future environment of human beings and other species. The journal was established in 1992 and edited by Alan Holland until 2007 when Clive L. Spash became editor-in-chief.

In 2013 the journal expanded to six issues a year. This was a result of increasing popularity and standing in the field.  According to the Journal Citation Reports, the journal has a 2015 impact factor of 1.311, ranking it 14th out of 51 journals in the category "Ethics".

Topics covered include aesthetics, biodiversity loss and management, synthetic biology, degrowth, ethical treatment of animals, future generations, human induced climate change, geoengineering, economic valuation, market economics, preferences, rights, responsibilities, risk and uncertainty.

See also 
 List of environmental social science journals
 List of ethics journals

References

External links 
 
Environmental ethics journals
Environmental social science journals
Economics journals
Quarterly journals
English-language journals
Publications established in 1992
Environmental humanities journals
Environmental philosophy